Carlos Luis Morales Benítez (12 June 1965 – 22 June 2020) was a journalist and a football goalkeeper from Ecuador. He also served as elected prefect of Guayas Province.

Corruption scandals

On June 3, 2020, Carlos Luis Morales was detained in an investigation for alleged use of unfair influence in the acquisition of medical supplies, COVID-19 exams and masks.

After 5 hours of persecution and police search, he was detained in San Isidro, a citadel on the road to Samborondón, after several houses were raided in the sector before he was captured, within investigations for alleged traffic crimes, of influence and embezzlement. The situation worsened after Morales presented 17 contracts  in which his wife, Sandra Arcos, and his wife's children, Xavier and Andrés Vélez, fugitives from justice,
involved in the awards, were involved in contracts with surcharges during the health emergency of COVID-19.

The corruption scandals occurred a year after occupying the post of Prefect of Guayas. PSC assembly members of the party that promoted his candidacy, asked Carlos Luis Morales to explain corruption allegations or resign. The pronouncement of the social-Christian legislators was signed by: Vicente Taiano, César Rohón, Raúl Auquilla, Patricia Henriquez, Mercedes Serrano, Vicente Almeyda, Henry Cucalón, Dennis Marín, Magda Zambrano, Ramón Terán, Raúl Campoverde, Cristina Reyes, Dallyana Passailague, Javier Cadena, Henry Kronfle, and Esteban Torres.

References

rsssf: Ecuador record international footballers

1965 births
2020 deaths
Sportspeople from Guayaquil
Association football goalkeepers
Ecuadorian footballers
Ecuador international footballers
1987 Copa América players
1989 Copa América players
1995 Copa América players
Barcelona S.C. footballers
Club Atlético Independiente footballers
L.D.U. Portoviejo footballers
C.S. Emelec footballers
Club Deportivo Palestino footballers
C.D. ESPOLI footballers
Ecuadorian expatriate footballers
Expatriate footballers in Argentina
Expatriate footballers in Chile
Argentine Primera División players